Matsumoto Bus Terminal (松本バスターミナル, Matsumoto Basu Tāminaru) is a bus terminal to the east of Matsumoto Station in  Matsumoto, Nagano, Japan, managed by Alpico Kōtsū.

Outline
This bus terminal is on the ground floor of "Matsuden Bus Terminal Building" which Alpico Kotsu owns and manages. "ALPICO PLAZA" is also on the building.

Lines

Commuter Lines
Track 1
Shindai-Yokota Cycle Line
Asama Line
Track 2
Yokota-Shindai Cycle Line
Shin-Asama Line
Track 3
Utsukushigahara-Spa Line
Iriyamabe Line
Shiga Line
Alps-Park Line
Track 4
Kotobukidai Line
Uchida Line
Namiyanagi Danchi Line
Track 5
Airport-Asahi Line
Kambayashi-Mizushiro Line
Yamagata Line
Kakeyu-Spa Line (Runs on weekdays)
Misayama Line
Nakayama Line

Highway Lines
Track 6
Chuo Highway Bus　Matsumoto Line; For Shinjuku Highway Bus Terminal
Chuodo Highway Bus Matsumoto Line; For Nagoya
Osaka Line (Alpin Matsumoto) For Kyōto, Ōsaka 
Track 7
For Kawaguchiko Station, Fuji-Q Highland
For Ueda Station (Nagano) (Runs on holidays and all days of August. Passengers are able to go to Ueda Station on weekdays by using Kakeyu-Spa Line.)
Track 8
For Kamikōchi
Shirahone-Onsen Line
Track 9
For Nagano Station
For Matsumoto Airport
Track 10
For Takayama
For Shinhotaka Ropeway
For Hakuba Happo
Track 11
For Keisei Ueno Station, Asakusa, Nishi-Funabashi, Narita International Airport

Companies
Alpico Kotsu
Kawanakajima Bus
Keio Bus
Meitetsu Bus
Hankyu Bus
Nohi Bus

Reference

Notes

External links

Official website
ALPICO PLAZA

Bus stations in Japan
Transport in Nagano Prefecture
Buildings and structures in Nagano Prefecture
Matsumoto, Nagano